I'm All Yours (original title:  Je suis à vous tout de suite) is a 2015 French comedy-drama film directed by Baya Kasmi, and co-written by Kasmi and Michel Leclerc.

Cast 
 Vimala Pons as Hanna Belkacem
 Mehdi Djaadi as Hakim / Donnadieu Belkacem
 Agnès Jaoui as Simone Belkacem
 Ramzy Bédia as Monsieur Belkacem
 Laurent Capelluto as Paul
 Claudia Tagbo as Ébène
 Camélia Jordana as Kenza
 Anémone as The grandmother
 Zinedine Soualem as Omar
 Carole Franck as Paul's sister
 Bruno Podalydès as Christophe
 Michel Leclerc as a grocery customer

References

External links 
 

2015 films
2015 comedy-drama films
2010s French-language films
French comedy-drama films
Films about families
2015 directorial debut films
2010s French films